Captain Luis Francisco Gómez Niño Air Base (also known as Apiay Air Base (Base Aérea de Apiay), is a Colombian military base assigned to the Colombian Air Force (Fuerza Aérea Colombiana or FAC) Combat Air Command No. 2 (Comando Aéreo de Combate No. 2 or CACOM 2). It also hosts members of the Colombian Army and Colombian Navy. The base is located in Apiay, near the city of Villavicencio, in the Department of Meta in central Colombia, by the steps of the Andes mountain range and the plains of the Colombian Llanos.

The base also hosts members of the United States Military under a cooperation program under Plan Colombia intended to help the Colombian military with the eradication of illegal drug trade and the illegally armed groups in the Colombian armed conflict.

Apiay has served as base for operations such as Plan Patriota which included operations such as Operation JM.

History 
The current Combat Air Command No. 2 (Comando Aéreo de Combate No. 2) was established in 1933, in the jungle, with the name San José del Guaviare Air Base (Base Aérea San José del Guaviare). In December 1947 it moved to the village of Apiay,  from Villavicencio, to become the Apiay National Airfield (Aeródromo Nacional de Apiay), an auxiliary to Madrid Air Base. In 1956 it was equipped with AT-6 Texan and T-34 Mentor aircraft, to provide training to pilots recently graduated from the Military Aviation School (Escuela Militar de Aviación). In 1959 the unit was elevated to a main base with the assignment of B-26 aircraft moved from the Palanquero Air Base, changing its name to Comando Aéreo de Bombardeo. In 1961 it received the name Luis F. Gómez Niño Air Base as a tribute to Captain Luis F. Gómez Niño (1896-1934), a Colombian military aviator.

In 1972, the base receives its first jet aircraft, T-33 and T-37, brought from the Combat Air Command No.1, and changes its name to the present day name of Combat Air Command No.2.

Today, the air base has responsibility for over 600.000 km2

Facilities 

Accidents and incidents
On 8 September 1969, Douglas C-47 FAC-685 of SATENA crashed near Apiay Air Force Base killing all 32 people on board. The aircraft was operating a domestic scheduled passenger flight from Monterrey Airport to Apiay.

References

1933 establishments in Colombia
Airports in Colombia
Colombian Air Force
Buildings and structures in Meta Department
Military installations of Colombia
Military airbases established in 1933